Guijiahu Reservoir is a reservoir located in Zhenning Buyei and Miao Autonomous County, Guizhou, China.

Etymology
It is called Guijiahu Reservoir due to the dam is located in the Guijiabao Village of Guijia Township.

History
Construction of the reservoir began in 1958 and were completed in 1966.

Function
The reservoir provide water for irrigation, hydroelectric power and recreational activities.

Dam

References 

 

Lakes of Guizhou
Zhenning Buyei and Miao Autonomous County